Delosperma lavisiae is a species of flowering plant in the family Aizoaceae, native to South Africa and Lesotho. It goes by a number of common names relating to its habitat, growing as high as  up in the Drakensberg mountains; Drakensberg ice plant, Drakensberg vygie, and mountain vygie.

References

lavisiae
Flora of Lesotho
Flora of South Africa
Plants described in 1928
Taxa named by Louisa Bolus